Walter Herbert Livsey (23 September 1893 – 12 September 1978) was an English first-class cricketer for Hampshire from 1913 until 1929. A wicket-keeper, Livsey played 320 matches and was considered one of the greatest keepers of the 1920s with 649 dismissals. He was also a tidy keeper, allowing only three byes during Oxford's 554–run innings in his first match. For this success he became Hampshire's regular keeper, and performed a noted stumping of Jack Hobbs in 1914. He fought during World War I, and was demobilised for the 1920 season. He continued at Hampshire until 1929, when his health forced him into retirement.

Early life

Livsey was born in Todmorden, Yorkshire, and was registered at birth as Walter Herbert Livesey, though he would use Livsey for the rest of his life. Initially, Livsey hoped to find a career at The Oval however the form of Bert Strudwick, who would later play 28 tests for England and took 1237 catches and 258 stumpings in first-class cricket, meant that he could not find a place. He was later persuaded to move to Hampshire to begin his cricketing career.

Career

Livsey's debut for Hampshire came on 30 June 1913 against Oxford University CC at the County Ground, Southampton. He scored 11* and 7*, taking two catches and making one stumping. He allowed only three byes in the University's first innings of 554. Such tidy keeping prompted Hampshire to take Livsey on as their regular keeper. He played his first full season the following year, playing 28 matches in all. Batting at number ten in the order, Livsey was not out on many occasions, 20 of his 37 innings during this season alone and across his whole career he was not out on 137 occasions. He scored only 130 runs in the 1914 season, with a high score of 42* and an average of 7.64, however he took 39 catches and completed 23 stumpings. The most famous of these, of Surrey player Jack Hobbs, was made on 23 July 1914 during a 3-day match at Portsmouth. Hobbs, on three, was bowled a "sharply lifting ball" by Alec Kennedy which was passing wide of leg stump. Livsey was able to retrieve the ball and remove the bails before Hobbs could get back behind the crease. This dismissal, of such a prestigious player, caused "quite a sensation" according to the Wisden Cricketers' Almanack.

Upon the outbreak of World War I at the end of the 1914 cricket season, Livsey joined the war effort. During his military career he played three cricket matches in India, across the winters of 1915–16, 1917–18 and 1918–19, scoring a total of 18 runs and taking two catches and completing three stumpings throughout. The third of these matches, in November 1918, was organised by Lord Willingdon to aid Indian Famine Relief, and was played between two teams dubbed "England" and "India", the former of which was captained by Willingdon himself. Livsey was not demobilised until 1919, and thus missed this season in England. He returned for the 1920 season, however, and enjoyed greater form with the bat: playing 26 matches and scoring 285 runs at 12.95. He also scored his maiden half-century with a season high score of 50*, and enjoyed success with the gloves also, taking 23 catches and completing 26 stumpings. This was to be surpassed in the 1921 season, however, with 48 catches and 32 stumpings from 29 matches. His form with the bat also improved, hitting 471 runs at 15.19, including two half-centuries and a high score of 70*. The latter score formed part of a 192 partnership with Horace Alexander William Bowell against Worcestershire on 10 August 1921.

In 1922, Livsey played 31 matches, with 348 runs at 14.50, 35 catches and 22 stumpings. During this season Livsey forged a partnership of 177 with George Brown against Warwickshire, who had scored 223 in their first innings and bowled Hampshire out for 15. In the follow-on, Hampshire had a lead of 66 when Livsey came in at number ten, however his maiden century, 110* with Brown and later Stuart Boyes, gave Hampshire a 155 run victory. He failed to pass 50 on any other occasions during that season, however.

The 1923 season saw reduced success for Livsey with the bat. He scored one half-century, however his season total was a lower 247 at 9.14, and this included 14 not outs. His glove work continued to be successful, however, taking 38 catches and performing 21 stumpings. In 1924 Livsey improved his batting once again with 369 runs at 12.72, with a high score of 67. In the 29 matches he played during the season, he also took 21 catches and completed 21 stumpings. In 1925 success with both bat and gloves continued, with 425 runs at 15.74, 21 catches and 21 stumpings from 27 matches, and 1926 saw a career-best 562 runs at 19.37, with two half-centuries, a top score of 54, 34 catches and 18 stumpings, all from 29 matches.

Livsey's batting continued to reach new heights in 1927, when he hit another career-best 615 runs from 27 matches at 20.50, the first time he had ever broken into the 20s with his batting average. He scored two half-centuries, the highest being 56*, and took 29 catches and completed 13 stumpings. His form with the bat peaked in 1928. Across 31 matches, Livsey scored 896 runs, including his only other first-class century, 109* against Kent in Dover on 29 June 1928. His average for the season was 22.97, a career best, and he scored two other half-centuries. He also took 38 catches and performed 29 stumpings. His final season in domestic cricket was equally successful with the gloves, taking 44 catches and completing 30 stumpings from 29 matches, however his form with the bat decreased, passing 50 only once and scoring 556 at 13.56. In his final match, played on 28 August 1929 against Gloucestershire, he completed three stumpings and scored four and 27 as Gloucestershire won by 14 runs. By the end of this season, his health forced him into retirement.

He was butler to his county captain, the Hon Lionel Tennyson (subsequently Lord Tennyson).

Notes

References

 Raiji, Vasant. C.K. Nayudu, the Shahenshah of Indian Cricket, 1989. 
 Wynne-Thomas, Peter, John Arlott and Victor Isaacs. The History of Hampshire County Cricket Club, 1988.

External links
 

1893 births
1978 deaths
Hampshire cricketers
People from Todmorden
British Army personnel of World War I
Players cricketers
English cricketers of 1919 to 1945
North v South cricketers
Wicket-keepers